The Shura Council or Consultative Council is the upper house of the parliament of Yemen, with the lower house being the House of Representatives. Unlike the House it does not take on a legislative role, instead primarily being charged with an advisory role to the president. Per the constitution it has 111 members who are appointed by the president. There currently exist two Shura Councils as a result of the civil war, one in Sanaa aligned with the Houthis, and one aligned with the Presidential Leadership Council in Aden.

History 
The Shura Council was established on 20 February 2001 by amendments to the constitution. Following the amendments, then-president Ali Abdullah Saleh appointed 111 members to the new council on 28 April 2001. As a result of the civil war, two bodies use the name of the Shura Council: One is based in Sanaa under Houthi control, with the other aligned with the Presidential Leadership Council, based in Aden. Some proposals have come forward to make changes to it: in 2015 it was proposed to expand the membership of the council, while in the same year it was also proposed during talks with the UN that the Shura Council be replaced with a transitional upper house which would consist more of underrepresented groups.

Role 
The constitution outlines a number of duties for the Shura Council, primarily consisting of consultative roles to the president, though also including a role in the presidential election process: presidential nominees are vetted for qualifications by, and confirmed in joint sessions of the Council and the House of Representatives. The constitution also creates a number of qualifications for candidates to the Council, and provides for the method of selection thereto:

The Council also meets with the House to vote on budgets and treaties, among other purposes as outlined by the President.

Leadership 
The leader of the council is known as the Speaker. Currently this role is fulfilled in the Aden-based council by Ahmed Obaid bin Dagher, who was appointed in 2021 along with two deputies, Abdullah Muhammad Abu Al-Ghaith and Taha Abdullah Jaafar Aman. This decision was criticized, however, by the Southern Transitional Council, as undermining the Riyadh Agreement. The speaker of the Sanaa council is Muhammad Hussein al-Aidarous.

See also 
Politics of Yemen
Yemeni Crisis (2011–present)

Notes

References

External links 
Website of the Sanaa Shura Council
Twitter account of the Aden Shura Council

National legislatures
Politics of Yemen
Government of Yemen
National upper houses